The Cuttle Brook is a watercourse in Oxfordshire, England. It originates from several short unnamed tributaries west of Chinnor and flows in a northwesterly direction until it flows into the River Thame on the northwestern edge of Thame. It flows through Thame, where it forms the Cuttle Brook Nature Reserve.

References

Rivers of Oxfordshire